Procarididea is an infraorder of decapods, comprising only eleven species. Six of these are in the genera Procaris and Vetericaris, which together make up the family Procarididae. The remaining five species are only known from fossils and belong to the genus Udora, which cannot yet be assigned to any family.

The cladogram below shows Procarididea's relationships to other relatives within Decapoda, from analysis by Wolfe et al., 2019.

References

Decapods
Arthropod infraorders